Look Model Agency is a modelling agency based in San Francisco, founded in 1986  by Marie-Christine and George Kollock, it has been at the forefront of the modelling world on the West Coast since inception. In 2015, Cyril Kollock took over direction as CEO.

Celebrities represented by Look (past and present)
Rebecca Romijn
Marjorie Conrad
Tatjana Patitz
Anna Nicole Smith
Claudia Schiffer
Jessica Alba
Michonne Bourriague
Amy Smart
Mary Nnenna
Jon Jonsson

See also
 List of modelling agencies

References

External links
Look Website

Modeling agencies